DigiD is an identity management platform which government agencies of the Netherlands, including the Tax and Customs Administration and Dienst Uitvoering Onderwijs, can use to verify the identity of Dutch residents on the Internet. In 2015 it was used for 200 million authentications by 12 million citizens. The system is tied to the Dutch national identification number (burgerservicenummer, BSN). The system has been mandatory when submitting tax forms electronically since 2006.

2011 Hacking incident
 
In July 2011, DigiNotar, the company that was providing the certificates used for DigiD under the PKI root-CA PKIoverheid, suffered the theft of hundreds of certificate codes. Although not directly linked to certificates used by DigiD, the result of the hack was that the government lost its trust in certificates issued by the company, both under their own root CA as well as the certificates under the governments' root PKIoverheid. Prosecutors said they would investigate the U.S.-owned, Netherlands-based DigiNotar.

See also 
 Electronic identity card

References

External links 
 

Government of the Netherlands
Identity management